Gujarat International Finance Tec-City (GIFT City) is central business district under construction in Gandhinagar and Ahmedabad in Gandhinagar district in Gujarat, India. It is India's first operational greenfield smart city and international financial services center, which the Government of Gujarat promoted as a greenfield project.

GIFT City, an emerging global financial and IT services hub and a first-of-its-kind in India, is designed to be at or above par with globally benchmarked business districts. GIFT City presents us with a one-time opportunity to create a corporate haven “like Delware island” that while being under Indian control, can provide entrepreneurs and investors with the best of both worlds.

It will allow India-based entrepreneurs incorporate in Gift City, let them accept investments in any currency from investors around the world (barring those from defined restricted jurisdictions, e.g. neighboring countries, sanctioned countries), let them hold money in USD or INR, let Indian residents be allowed to invest freely and let them list in the NSE/BSE or on NASDAQ/HongKong or London Stock Exchanges. When entrepreneurs or employees or investors based in India make money, or companies become profitable, just set it up so that they pay their taxes in India, regardless of where they get listed themselves.

Setting up GIFT City as a hybrid location can quickly make GIFT City the preferred choice of entrepreneurs and ensure that the long-term value capture happens in India. Startups across India will be from all corners, and GIFT City can be a great common denominator, while allowing the freedom to leverage the distributed ecosystem of India. Anything domestic will still be in the form of a wholly owned subsidiary, but allow Indian AIFs or overseas investors to invest in GIFT City incorporated companies in INR or USD, pari-passu. One small but important benefit is that all the investment dollars which are currently being held in banks in the US/Singapore will also now be held in the “Indian” banking system, whether in USD or INR.

Location and implementation
The city is designed so residents can walk to work, and includes commercial, financial and residential complexes.

The city is connected through 4-6 lane State and National Highways. A metro station is also planned for construction, which would connect GIFT City to the Ahmedabad Metro network, and is expected to be completed by March 2024.

The total area for the development of GIFT is 886 acres out of which the SEZ (Special Economic Zone) constitutes 261 acres. The project area under development can hence be classified under the SEZ area and the Non-SEZ area (also known as the Domestic Tariff area or the DTA).

GIFT City has dedicated Multi Services Special Economic Zone (SEZ) for international operations of various services sectors players. Also within the GIFT Multi Services SEZ, GIFT houses India's first International Financial Services Center (IFSC) approved by the Government of India.

For the purpose of implementation of the SEZ, GIFT Company Limited has set up an SPV (Special Purpose Vehicle) (100% subsidiary of GIFTCL) namely GIFT SEZ Ltd, designated as the developer organization of the SEZ. GIFTCL has also set up 5 subsidiary companies for the implementation of specialized infrastructure including Power, Water, ICT (Information & Communication Technology), District Cooling and solid waste management.

History

On 15 December 2011, The Economic Times reported city officials in GIFT were inviting companies from Singapore that wished to expand but could not do so due to a lack of land in Singapore to open their businesses in GIFT. Investments from banks, private equity companies, insurance companies and asset management companies were considered.

On 26 December 2011, The Times of India reported China's technology giant Huawei was likely to provide technology to GIFT.  According to Eric Yu, president, enterprise business of Huawei India, this technology included networks, data centres and surveillance.

On 2 October 2014, NetIndian reported a new World Trade Center would be set up in GIFT City as per an agreement between World Trade Center India Services Council (WTCS) and GIFT City Ltd. It would be completed within four years.

BSE Broker's Forum planned to invest  to build a commercial tower to set up back-office operations. They were allocated  to develop the commercial tower with the likelihood of setting up an exchange office.

According to The Times of India on 18 October 2014, the Bangalore-based Brigade Group would invest  over the next few years  to develop  of built up area with a future option of investing another  to develop .

In November 2018, The Wire reported the Government of Gujarat State would buy out the 50% stake of beleaguered Infrastructure Leasing & Financial Services (IL&FS) in the GIFT City to minimize delays to the project. In June, 2020, IL&FS concluded sale of its stake in GIFT-City for  equity value to the state government.

According to Business Standard, OPS Fund Services, a subsidiary of OPS Global, Singapore, received a license to open in the International Financial Service Centre at GIFT city.

On 5 December 2019, Business Standard reported that Bank of America opened a Global Business Services Center at GIFT.

On 6 January 2020, Accor opened the first international hotel in GIFT City.

On 20 January 2020,  The Economic Times reported GIFT was ready to begin trading in rupee-dollar in the futures market.

In July 2022, JPMorgan Chase, Deutsche Bank and Mitsubishi UFJ Financial Group opened new offices at the International Financial Services Centre. Prime Minister Narendra Modi formally opened Singapore Exchange's futures trading operation "Nifty", and India's first international bullion exchange was opened.

Construction timeline

Two 28-floor commercial towers called GIFT One and GIFT Two have been finished. Tendering for the construction of more towers is ongoing. This phase will also include the building of basic infrastructure. India's first city-level district cooling system (DCS) is operational at GIFT City. The first phase of this DCS, with a capacity of 10,000 Ton of refrigeration has been in operation since April 2015; it is designed to reduce the operational cost and avoid the capital cost of implementing individual air conditioners in each building.

Consultants
 Owner - The Amazing
 Design and Architecture - East China Architectural Design & Research Institute (ECADI) and Fairwood Consultants India
 ICT Advisory Services - British Telecom
 Market Demand Assessment - McKinsey & Company
 Talent Demand Assessment - Hewitt Associates
 Environmental Assessment - IL&FS Ecosmart Ltd
 Process Management - IL&FS Infrastructure Development Corporation Ltd
 Power Management - ABB Group

Status

Divisions 

The total area for the development of GIFT is 886 acres out of which the SEZ (Special Economic Zone) constitutes 261 acres. The project area under development can hence be classified under the SEZ area and the Non-SEZ area (also known as the Domestic Tariff area or the DTA).

GIFT City has dedicated Multi Services Special Economic Zone (SEZ) for international operations of various services sectors players. Also within the GIFT Multi Services SEZ, GIFT houses India's first International Financial Services Center (IFSC) approved by the Government of India.

Administration

Gujarat International Finance Tec-City Company Limited 
The Government of Gujarat formed "Gujarat International Finance Tec-City Company Limited" (GIFTCL) to develop and implement GIFT City through its venture Gujarat Urban Development Company Limited (GUDCL). GIFT City is an 886-acre integrated project that creates 62 million square feet of built-up area, including 67% commercial space, 22% residential space and 11% community space.

GIFT Managing Bodies 
For the purpose of implementation of the SEZ, GIFT Company Limited has set up an SPV (Special Purpose Vehicle) (100% subsidiary of GIFTCL) namely GIFT SEZ Ltd, designated as the developer organization of the SEZ. GIFTCL has also set up 5 subsidiary companies for the implementation of specialized infrastructure including Power, Water, ICT (Information & Communication Technology), District Cooling and solid waste management.
 Gift Power Company Limited
 Gift Waste Management Services Limited
 Gift Water Infrastructure Limited
 Gift ICT Services Limited
 Gift Collective Investment Management Company Limited
 Gift SEZ Limited

References

External links
 
 International Financial Services Center
 
 GIFT City Helpdesk Application or Helpdesk Website

Proposed infrastructure in Gujarat
Economy of Gujarat
Science and technology in Gujarat
Financial districts in India
Buildings and structures under construction in India
Planned cities in India
Financial services in India
Chief Ministership of Narendra Modi
Economy of Ahmedabad